Water Valley High School is a public high school located in the community of Water Valley, Texas, in Tom Green County, United States and classified as a 2A school by the UIL. It serves the communities of Water Valley and Carlsbad, and the surrounding rural areas. In 2015, the school was rated "met standard" by the Texas Education Agency.

Athletics
The Water Valley Wildcats compete in these sports - 

Basketball
Cross country running
Football
Tennis
Track and field
Volleyball

State titles
Volleyball -  1986(1A), 2011(1A)
Basketball -  2014(1A)
Boys' track -  2015(1A), 2016(1A)

State finalist
Boys' track -2014(1A), 2017 (1A)

References

External links
Water Valley ISD

Schools in Tom Green County, Texas
Public high schools in Texas